The biscione ("big grass snake"), less commonly known also as the vipera ("viper"), is a heraldic charge showing on argent an azure serpent in the act of eating or giving birth to a human. It is a historic symbol of the city of Milan, used by companies based in the city.

History

Etymologically, word biscione is a masculine augmentative of Italian feminine biscia "grass snake" (corrupted from bistia, ultimately from Latin  "beast").

The charge became associated with the city after the Visconti family gained control over Milan 1277; Bonvesin da la Riva records it in his De magnalibus urbis Mediolani (On the Marvels of the City of Milan) as a Visconti symbol no later than the end of the 13th century. The symbol may have been derived from a bronzed serpent brought to Milan from Constantinople by Arnolf II of Arsago (Archbishop of Milan 998–1018) in the 11th century. 

One of the oldest depictions of the Biscione is in the Great Hall of the Visconti Castle of Angera. The hall was painted at the end of the 13th century with frescoes celebrating Archbishop Ottone Visconti's victory against the rival family of the Della Torre. The viper swallowing a small human figure is depicted in the pendentives of the hall.

The biscione remained associated with the Duchy of Milan even after the Visconti line died out in the 15th century. The House of Sforza incorporated the symbol into their armorial after taking the duchy.

Contemporary use
As a symbol of Milan, the biscione is used by multiple organizations associated with or based in the city. Football club Inter Milan is commonly represented by a biscione, and the team's 2010–11 away shirt prominently featured the symbol. Milan-based auto manufacturer Alfa Romeo (also known as the Casa del Biscione, Italian for "House of the Biscione" or "Biscione['s] marque") includes a biscione in its logo impaled with a red cross on white (derived from the flag of Milan), as does espresso machine manufacturer Bezzera. Silvio Berlusconi, who was born and remains based in Milan, uses stylized biscione symbols in the logos for his companies Mediaset and Fininvest (with the child replaced by a flower); his residential zones Milano Due and Milano Tre and the Mediaset-owned television channel Canale 5 all also use biscione-inspired imagery.

Outside Milan, a similar design is found in the seals of the Hungarian nobleman Nicholas I Garai, palatine to the King of Hungary (1375–1385). Here the crowned snake devours a sovereign's orb, rather than a human. The arms of the towns of Sanok in Poland and Pruzhany in Belarus also feature the symbol, honoring the marriage of Bona Sforza to Sigismund I of Poland while both towns were part of Poland–Lithuania.

The band Lacuna Coil used a biscione for the Black Anima album cover artwork and limited edition tarot cards.

Similar symbols
Comparable to the biscione are some depictions of the Hindu deity Matsya. While his form is referred to as anthropomorphically having a humanoid upper half, and his lower half as that of a fish, some depictions show him with his upper body emerging from the mouth of a fish. In early Christian art of the catacombs, the Old Testament prophet Jonah is depicted as a man being swallowed by a serpent-like Leviathan, a sea creature of Hebrew myth.

Coats of arms, flags and symbols bearing the biscione

See also
 Flag of Milan
 Guivre
 History of Milan
 Basilisk
 Leviathan
 Ouroboros

Notes

References

Bibliography

External links 

Heraldic beasts
Legendary serpents

History of Milan
Culture in Milan
Italian legendary creatures
Fictional snakes
Snakes in art
Italian heraldry